Nevskia terrae is a Gram-negative, strictly aerobic and motile bacterium from the genus of Nevskia which has been isolated from soil from the Baekryong Island in Korea.

References

Bacteria described in 2011
Xanthomonadales